Marijana Kovačević (born 20 July 1978) is a Croatian former professional tennis player.

A right-handed player from Zagreb, Kovačević made her WTA Tour main draw debut at the Zagreb Open in 1995, as a singles wildcard. She lost her first round match in three sets to Ludmila Richterova.

Kovačević competed mostly on the ITF Circuit, winning three titles in singles and seven titles in doubles.

ITF Circuit finals

Singles: 8 (3–5)

Doubles: 13 (7–6)

References

External links
 
 

1978 births
Living people
Croatian female tennis players
Tennis players from Zagreb